Şenol is a Turkish masculine given name. Notable people with the name include:

 Şenol Can (born 1983), Bulgarian footballer and manager
 Şenol Çorlu, Turkish footballer
 Şenol Güneş, Turkish footballer

See also 
 Canan Senol (born 1970), Turkish-Kurdish visual artist

Turkish masculine given names